Kam Wai Leung (born 6 July 1950) is a Hong Kong épée, foil and sabre fencer. He competed in five events at the 1976 Summer Olympics.

References

1950 births
Living people
Hong Kong male épée fencers
Olympic fencers of Hong Kong
Fencers at the 1976 Summer Olympics
Fencers at the 1974 Asian Games
Asian Games competitors for Hong Kong
Hong Kong male foil fencers
Hong Kong male sabre fencers
20th-century Hong Kong people